Galaxy Macau is a casino resort located in Cotai, Macau, SAR of People's Republic of China. Construction on the Cotai project began in 2002.  Its opening was rescheduled several times. Its developer, Galaxy Entertainment Group, announced on 10 March 2011 that the HKD 14.9 billion (US$1.9 billion) resort would officially open on 15 May 2011. The resort is designed by Gary Goddard. The resort currently consists of five different hotels, each with its own 'theme', Galaxy Macau, Banyan Tree, Hotel Okura, The Ritz-Carlton and JW Marriott.

History
When the Cotai project's first phase opened in 2011. The  property offered around 2,200 hotel rooms comprising the Galaxy Macau hotel tower complete with casino and entertainment areas, as well as two hotel partners, the Japanese-owned Hotel Okura and the Singapore-operated Banyan Tree Hotel.

On 26 April 2012, Galaxy Macau announced that JW Marriott and Ritz-Carlton hotels would be added to the Cotai resort. Galaxy's Chief Financial Officer Robert Drake said it would start construction of the two hotels at the end of 2013 and begin operations gradually from 2016 through 2018.

According to a presentation released by Galaxy Entertainment, the total investment for Galaxy Phase 2 was estimated to be 16 billion HKD with construction completion scheduled for mid-2015. Phase 2 was eventually opened on 27 May 2015.

Gold Leaf Cupolas

There are 6 gold-covered cupolas at the top of the two towers of Galaxy Macau. The cupolas feature a laser show system which projects laser beams into the sky every 15 minutes. It is claimed to be the largest laser show in the world and is visible across Macau.

UA Galaxy Cinemas
On 15 December 2011, Galaxy Macau opened UA Galaxy Cinemas & East Square.

Hotels in Galaxy Macau

Future Developments
As part of its Phase 3 expansion, a large-scale 16,000-seat arena named Galaxy Arena, a 650-seat auditorium, 40,000 square metres of MICE space, and a 700-room Andaz hotel are scheduled to be completed in the second half of 2021. The expansion, named Galaxy International Convention Centre (GICC), will be built adjacent to Macau Light Rapid Transit's Cotai West Station. Announced on 1 March 2021, Galaxy Macau has signed an agreement with Accor (Raffles Hotels & Resorts) to bring the Raffles brand to the resort. The 450-room Raffles at Galaxy Macau will be housed in an all-new exclusive all-suite tower that is currently under construction as part of Phase 3. Located east of the resort, the hotel will feature a glass airbridge connecting the two towers on every floor. A Mediterranean-inspired garden with a glass house as its focal point, an infinity edge pool, a luxury spa, and a fine dining restaurant are also part of the hotel. Raffles at Galaxy Macau is scheduled to open in the second half of 2021.

Phase 4 of the expansion will primarily be non-gaming focused and will add approximately 2,000 hotel rooms to the resort. It is scheduled to be completed in 2022.

See also
 Gambling in Macau
 List of Macau casinos

References

Casinos completed in 2011
Hotel buildings completed in 2011
Casinos in Macau
Resorts in Macau
Hotels in Macau
2011 establishments in Macau
Cotai